Stephan Knoll (born 16 March 1973 in Oberstdorf) is a German curler. He is World men's silver medallist and two time European men's champion. He competed at the 2002 Salt Lake City Olympics on the German team that placed sixth with a 4-5 record. He played for Team Europe at 2004 Continental Cup of Curling.

Teams

References

External links
 

1973 births
Living people
People from Oberstdorf
Sportspeople from Swabia (Bavaria)
German male curlers
Olympic curlers of Germany
Curlers at the 2002 Winter Olympics
Continental Cup of Curling participants
European curling champions
21st-century German people